John Joseph Jones may refer to:

 Jack Jones (Silvertown MP) (1873–1941), British Member of Parliament (MP)
 Jack Jones (Australian politician) (1907–1997), Australian politician
 John Joseph Jones (writer) (1930–2000), British and Australian poet, folk singer, musician, playwright, and theatre director

See also 
 John Jones (disambiguation)
 Jack Jones (disambiguation)
 Joseph Jones (disambiguation)